Mikhail Aleksandrovich Afanasov (Russian: Михаил Александрович Афанасов; born on 15 June 1953), is a Russian politician, and economist, who is currently the Senator from Stavropol Krai on Executive Authority since 11 November 2020.

As he already served as the Senator from 2012 to 2019, he served as the Deputy Chairman of the Government of the Stavropol Krai from 2019 to 2020.

He is a PhD in economics in 2004.

Biography

Mikhail Aleksandrovich Afanasov was born on 15 June 1953 in the city of Yessentuki, Stavropol Krai.

In 1979, he graduated from the Stavropol Agricultural Institute with a degree in economist-organizer of agricultural production.

He started his professional career as a car mechanic, then worked as an engineer and site manager.

In 1995, he founded the production and financial group of companies "MiG" in Yessentuki, and took the position of chairman of the board of directors in it.

In 2001, he was elected to the Duma of Stavropol Krai of the 3rd convocation, and in 2007, during the elections to the Duma of the 4th convocation, his single-mandate constituency became the only one in the region where the regional list of United Russia received more votes than the list of A Just Russia ". As a member of parliaament, he served on the Committee on Budget, Taxes and Financial and Credit Policy. He was awarded with a medal and a diploma of the laureate of the V. Svyatoslav Fedorov "For noble thoughts and worthy deeds" in May 2002, and the medal "For services to the Stavropol Territory", "Tersk Cossack Cross of General Ermolov", and the honorary medal "For achievements in environmental protection.".

He received a PhD in economics in 2004, as he defended his thesis in 2004 at the Moscow Institute of Management, Economics and Finance of the State Technical University.

Afanasov's business projects include Kavminekocenter LLC, Edelweiss LLC, Cosmos Shopping and Entertainment Complex (Pyatigorsk), Interregional Construction Alliance, MBA Investment Group and others.

On 17 August 2012, he was endowed with the powers as a Senator of Stavropol Krai on the executive body of state power of the Stavropol Krai. He entered the Federation Council Committee on Constitutional Legislation and State Building.

On 27 September 2019, Afanasov was replaced by Sergey Melikov who had become the new senator, by the decree of the governor of Stavropol Krai, Vladimir Vladimirov, as Vladimirov was reelected for a second term.

On 1 November 2019, by order of the Governor of the Stavropol Territory, Vladimirov appointed Afanasov as the Deputy Prime Minister of the Government of the Stavropol Krai, as Irina Kuvaldina, on 18 October 18 was sent to court on charges of embezzling budget funds.

On 14 October 2020, he was appointed Senator again.

References

1953 births
Living people
People from Yessentuki
United Russia politicians
Members of the Federation Council of Russia (after 2000)